Balanced anesthesia is an anesthetic method for surgical patients during their operation, which was proposed by John Lundy in 1926. The purpose of balanced anesthesia is not only to be less dangerous than using only one drug to make patients general anesthesia but also to minimise the potential adverse side effects which may cause by the anesthetic agents. The concept of balanced anesthesia is that applying two or more medications or techniques in order to help patients to ease pain, relax the muscles and have autonomous reflection suppression. In other words, it is an anesthesia method to maintain stable vital signs. There are numerous factors that come in play when the anesthetist decides to use this method of anesthesia. These factors include, but are not limited to, patients'  major organ functions, general condition and compensatory capacity. The anesthetist needs to make use of adequate types, appropriate amounts of agents and the accurate anesthesia method, which will promote the surgery to be successful, safe, and efficient.

Principles of Pharmacokinetic of balanced anesthesia
The portions of the pharmacodynamics are the effects caused by a medicine. However, the distribution of medicine, clearance and the concentration of medicine in tissue, blood or plasma are main portions of the pharmacokinetic features. Using the anesthetic injection medicine, which is a portion of balanced anesthetic techniques, can be made like a single intermittent dose or as a single injection. It should keep a constant  rate infusion during the time (CRI). Both the foreseeable pharmacodynamic effects and foreseeable concentration of plasma can be offered by the CRI of specific medicine. It has similarity on keeping the invariable concentration of end-tidal by using the vaporous precise device, which can provide the volatile anesthetic.

When the administration rate exceeds the clearance rate, a stable-state concentration has been achieved by delivering the medicine as a CRI. In addition, if the medicine has distributed fully at equilibrium in the body, which is called the volume of distribution at a stable state. In case the loading dose was administered after the CRI, the time period of which will keep the concentration at a stable state equals 3 time constants or  5 terminal half-lives of the specific medicine. The bolus dose can full with the volume of the medicine in an efficiently and effectively way in order that the medicine can be cleared and delivered. This also can promote to achieve the stable state in a prompter approach.

Administering a CRI has two important methods, which are targeting the infusion rate and making the infusion rate constant.
 Make The Infusion Rate Constant

It is relatively simple to make the infusion rate stay stable and supposed that the stable-state concentration is gained on the basis of proper distribution. Whereas, due to the saturated state of tissues and the same rate of infusion, it has possibility to excess the clearance and gain a higher concentration of plasma than the expected concentration. Hence, for this modality, it is necessary to adjust the CRI as the time goes by.
 Target The Infusion Rate

This type of infusion rate is changed based on the specific rate constants. These rate constants control the movements of medicine in the compartments on the basis of saturated state of the tissues, which is decided by the study population in prior pharmacokinetic studies. Because a large amount of knowledge about the specific pharmacokinetic constants  and the target-controlled infusion system which is made up of the computer program and the syringe pump needs to be known, it is extremely difficult to set up the target infusions in clinical conditions. Therefore, making the infusion rate constant are applied more widely than targeting the infusion rate.

Most frequently used anesthetic agents during balanced anesthetic operation
The amount of using single anesthetics which is used for balanced techniques has similarity with that which is used for standing sedation. However, compare to the doses used for TIVA(Total intravenous anesthesia), which is always lower than using the single anesthetics. The doses of anesthetics will have a change, which depends on the required time of anesthesia, the requirements for  anesthesia to volatile, expected pain of injection of anesthesia, the experience the anesthetist have using various medicine excluded other factors.

According to a latest review of using the injection of anesthesia from the American association, the report has illustrated that for a short time anesthesia, whose duration is 20 minutes, the most recommend induction method is to use xylazine which is used as a sedative medicine. In addition, the diazepam and ketamine are recommended after the xylazine.  For a long time anesthesia, whose duration is over 30 minutes, the most common anesthetics, which is widely used in the operation, is the combination of guaifenesin, ketamine, and xylazine or isoflurane.

The pharmacokinetics of most 2 common anesthetic agents, which is xylazine and  Ketamine respectively, using during the operation will be described as follow:

Xylazine

Xylazine is a most widely anesthetic agent used for the short time operation.

Pharmacokinetics

Pharmacokinetics of xylazine may be influenced by anesthesia since after an intravenous therapy about 1.1 mg/kg, the half-life of xylazine will increase to 118 minutes and the clearance will decrease to 6 mL/kg/min. Based on a recent study, if injecting the morphine, which is 0.1 or 0.2 mg/kg, in the vein at the same time can extend the terminal half-life to about 150 minutes and the clearance will not be influenced.

Ketamine

Ketamine is the most widely anesthetic agent used for the long time operation.

Pharmacokinetics

After an intravenous therapy, which is about 2.2 mg/kg, mixed with the 1.1 mg/kg xylazine the half-life of xylazine is approximately 66 minutes and the clearance is around 31 mL/kg/min when patients are halothane-anesthetized. If only managing the  xylazine and ketamine, the terminal half-life will be 42 minutes and its clearance will be 27 mL/kg/min. When the CRI of  ketamine keeps stable for an hour at 2.4 mg/kg/h, the terminal half-life will be 46 minutes and the clearance will be 32 mL/kg/min.

Advantages of balanced anesthesia
Compare with the general anesthesia, balanced anesthesia has various advantages. In some extent, applying balanced anesthesia is considerably cheaper than the usual anesthesia. Secondly, it can decline the death rate and incidence. Furthermore, it offers more stable operating conditions for veterinarians.

Balanced anesthesia can not only decrease the risk patients suffered from the operation but also increase patient's safety and comfort. The 3 main advantages of balanced anesthesia are making patients calm, minimizing the pain patients suffered and decreasing  the adverse effects using the anesthetic agents.

The first advantage is balanced anesthesia can make patients calm by using the drugs, such as: medetomidine, diazepam or midazolam and acepromazine. It is considerably important to make patients calm before the surgery because it can decrease the difficulties to work out the issues and decrease the patients' stress. As we all know, stress will result several unpredictable consequences, patients may be tachypnoea, hypertension and tachycardia. These may be harmful to the anesthetized patients. In addition, anxiety and stress may cause the nociceptive pain. Therefore, using balanced anesthesia can promote patients clam, which can lead the operation more successful.

The second advantage is using balanced anesthesia can decrease the adverse effects. All medicines may have adversely effect to patients. Some serious adversely effect of anesthesia may be caused by inhalant anesthetics although these medicines are highly safe and useful. Using the actual amount of balanced anesthetic agents, the adverse effects can be reduced in some extent.

The third advantage of balanced anesthesia is that it can minimize the pain patients suffered. It is approved that pain will delay wound healing, decrease the appetite and even result to death. Using proper amount of analgesics can reduce the amount of  inhalant anesthetics and help patients reduce the pain.

Using the balanced anesthesia needs to make an evaluation for the operation and patients. Choosing the suitable type and amount of anesthetic agents is the best method  for an operation.

Balanced Anesthetic Techniques in cats and dogs

The techniques of balanced anesthesia used for the individuals  are moderate and developed successfully. At the same time, with the advancement of modern technology and society, the techniques of balanced anesthetic used in cats and dogs has been applied more widely, which means obvious effect has achieved using the balanced anesthetic techniques during the operation of cat and dogs.

It is not necessary for cats and dogs to apply general anesthesia in veterinary surgery. For several  humanities reasons, the most common method of general anesthesia for cats and dogs is inhalant anesthetic agents because it is both easy to manage and the depth of anesthesia can be predictable. In addition, the depth of anesthesia can be changed and recovery in time if some unexpected situation happened suddenly. Although inhalation anesthesia will cause an unconscious state, in this state, cats and dogs will not recall or perceive harmful stimulation, the deep depth of anesthesia may nor prevent the variety of reflection reaction to harmful stimulation which may happened during the operation period. In order to prevent these reflection reactions needs to increase the concentration of inhalant anesthetic agents, it may even result the serious cardiovascular and respiratory depression for young patient. High amounts of inhalant anesthetic agents will make the patients who have the serious systemic disease be depressive and even increase the morbidity and mortality. Compare with the balanced anesthetic techniques, the low concentration of inhalant anesthetic agents and other medicines are used during the operation, which can alter the harmful stimulation. In other words, using balanced anesthetic techniques for cats and dogs can decrease the morbidity and mortality effectively. Therefore, in this situation, using balanced anesthetic techniques in cats and dogs is less risky for operation than using the general anesthesia. According to a report from teaching hospital, it shows the information that the rate of cats and dogs using the balanced anesthesia will suffer the complications and death are relatively low, which is 1/9 and 1/233 respectively.

References

Anesthesia